Range Regional Airport  is a public use airport located four nautical miles (5 mi, 7 km) southeast of the central business district of Hibbing, in Saint Louis County, Minnesota, United States. It was formerly known as Chisholm-Hibbing Airport or Chisholm-Hibbing Municipal Airport. The airport is mostly used for general aviation but is also served by one commercial and one charter airline. Scheduled passenger service is subsidized by the Essential Air Service program.

As per Federal Aviation Administration records, the airport had 8,896 passenger boardings (enplanements) in calendar year 2008, 8,926 enplanements in 2009, and 11,227 in 2010. It is included in the National Plan of Integrated Airport Systems for 2011–2015, which categorized it as a non-primary commercial service airport based on 2008 enplanements (between 2,500 and 10,000), but would be considered primary commercial service based on enplanements in 2010.

Facilities and aircraft
Range Regional Airport covers an area of 1,600 acres (647 ha) at an elevation of 1,354 feet (413 m) above mean sea level. It has two runways with asphalt surfaces: 13/31 is 6,758 by 150 feet (2,060 x 46 m) and 4/22 is 3,075 by 75 feet (937 x 23 m).

For the 12-month period ending December 31, 2014, the airport had 30,365 aircraft operations, an average of 83 per day: 82% general aviation, 9% air taxi, 9% scheduled commercial and <1% military. In January 2017, there were 43 aircraft based at this airport: 40 single-engine, 2 multi-engine and 1 helicopter.

Airline and destination

Passenger

Top destinations

Accidents and incidents
2 January 1993: An Express Airlines Saab 340A crashed hard onto the runway at Chisholm-Hibbing Municipal Airport due to wing ice accretion. There were no fatalities, but the aircraft was destroyed.

1 December 1993: Northwest Airlink Flight 5719 crashed while on approach to Chisholm-Hibbing Airport. All 18 passengers and crew on board were killed.

References

External links
 Range Regional Airport, official website
 Range Regional Airport at City of Hibbing website
  at Minnesota DOT Airport Directory
 Aerial image as of May 1992 from USGS The National Map
 

Airports in Minnesota
Transportation in St. Louis County, Minnesota
Buildings and structures in St. Louis County, Minnesota
Essential Air Service
Hibbing, Minnesota